Walk Tall is a 1960 American Western film directed by Maury Dexter and written by Joseph Fritz, presented in CinemaScope and DeLuxe Color. The film stars Willard Parker, Joyce Meadows, Kent Taylor, Russ Bender, Ron Soble and William Mims. The film was released on September 1, 1960, by 20th Century Fox.

Plot

Lawman Ed Trask (Willard Parker) tries to bring in outlaw Ed Carter (Kent Taylor). Carter nearly provokes a war when he and his gang brutally raid a Shoshone community.

Cast 
 Willard Parker as Captain Ed Trask
 Joyce Meadows as Sally Medford
 Kent Taylor as Frank Carter
 Russ Bender as Col. Stanton
 Ron Soble as Leach
 William Mims as Jake 
 Alberto Monte as Carlos
 Felix Locher as Chief Black Feather
 Dave DePaul as Buffalo Horn

Production 
The film was shot in San Bernardino National Forest in June, 1960.

References

External links 
 
 
 
 

1960 films
1960s English-language films
20th Century Fox films
CinemaScope films
American Western (genre) films
1960 Western (genre) films
Films directed by Maury Dexter
1960s American films